Johann Fischer may refer to:

Entertainment
 Johann Georg Fischer (painter) (1580–1643), German historical painter
 Johann Fischer (composer) (1646–1716), German violinist, pianist, and composer of the Baroque era
 Johann Caspar Ferdinand Fischer (1656–1746), German Baroque composer
 Johann Christian Fischer (1733–1800), German composer and oboist
 Johann Ignaz Ludwig Fischer (c. 1745–1825), German opera singer
 Johann Georg Fischer (1816–1897), German poet and playwright

Science
 Johann Bernhard Fischer (1685–1772), German doctor, medical adviser to Empress Anna
 Johann Fischer von Waldheim (1771–1853), German anatomist, entomologist, and paleontologist
 Johann Conrad Fischer (1773–1854), Swiss metallurgist
 Johann Nepomuk Fischer (1777–1847), Austrian ophthalmologist
 Johann Baptist Fischer (1803–1832), German naturalist, zoologist, and botanist
 Johann Gustav Fischer (1819–1889), German herpetologist

Other
 Johann Bernhard Fischer von Erlach (1656–1723), Austrian architect, sculptor, and architectural historian
 Johann Michael Fischer (1692–1766),  German architect in the late Baroque period
 Johann Erhard Fischer (1817–1884), German Lutheran pastor

See also
John Fischer (disambiguation)
John Fisher (disambiguation)
Johannes Fischer (1887–?), German physicist